South Shore Mall (formerly known as Westfield South Shore Mall) is a super-regional shopping mall in Bay Shore, New York. The mall is owned by the Namdar Realty Group, and has  of gross leasable area. The mall features the traditional chains Dick's Sporting Goods, Forever 21, JCPenney, and Macy's.
Restaurants in the mall include Panera Bread, The Cheesecake Factory and Buffalo Wild Wings.

History
The mall was opened in 1963 by the R.H. Macy Company, which opened the 3-level,  Macy's as the original anchor. The open-air, 70-store first phase of the mall was completed by 1967, and originally included stores such as Record Town, Woolworth's, Lerner Shops, Bond's, and JCPenney, which was the first in-line JCPenney location in the New York area at the time. The mall's Loews Theaters location opened around the same time. In the mid 1970s, there was also a section of the mall divided into an area named "Captree Corners", a bazaar-like setup of small stores clustered into a village-like mini-mall area.

The mall was fully enclosed in 1975. In December 1986, the mall's ownership was sold to the Westfield Corporation for $85 million. Shortly after the change in ownership, plans for an expansion were underway. A two-level (120,000 ft²) Lord & Taylor eventually opened in late 1998, replacing the former Woolworth. On March 4, 2012, Macy's shuttered to make way for a newly built two-story Macy's location at the mall. It opened on August 14, 2013. In May 2015, it was announced that Sears would shutter as part of an ongoing plan to phase out of brick-and-mortar. On June 16, 2016, Dick's Sporting Goods announced that it would be opening in the former Sears space. 

On August 27, 2020, Lord & Taylor announced it would shutter it's brick-and-mortar fleet after modernizing into a digital collective department store.

On January 3, 2023, Unibail-Rodamco-Westfield sold this mall along with Westfield Trumbull in Trumbull, Connecticut for a combined deal of $196 million to the Namdar Realty Group.

References

External links
Official website

Shopping malls in New York (state)
Shopping malls established in 1963
Shopping malls in the New York metropolitan area